Division No. 2 is a census division in Alberta, Canada. It is located in the south-central portion of southern Alberta and includes the City of Lethbridge.

Census subdivisions 
The following census subdivisions (municipalities or municipal equivalents) are located within Alberta's Division No. 2.

Cities
Lethbridge
Brooks
Towns
Bassano
Coaldale
Coalhurst
Milk River
Picture Butte
Raymond
Taber
Vauxhall
Villages
Barnwell
Barons
Coutts
Duchess
Nobleford
Rosemary
Stirling
Warner
Hamlets
Tilley
Municipal districts
Lethbridge County
Newell, County of
Taber, M.D. of
Warner No. 5, County of

Demographics 

See also 
List of census divisions of Alberta
List of communities in Alberta

References 

D02